is a Japanese astronomer.

He discovered the periodic comets 70P/Kojima and 1972j.

Asteroid 4351 Nobuhisa was named after him.

References

20th-century Japanese astronomers
Living people
1933 births
Place of birth missing (living people)
Discoverers of comets